Rami Suhail (born 27 May 2000), is a Qatari professional footballer with Iraqi origins, who plays as a winger for Qatar Stars League side Al-Arabi.

Personal life
Suhail is the son of former Iraqi national team goalkeeper Suhail Saber. His brother Ahmed Suhail is a football player that has also been naturalised by Qatar.

Career statistics

Club

Honours
Al Sadd
Qatar Cup: 2021

References

External links
 

2000 births
Living people
Qatari footballers
Qatari people of Iraqi descent
Naturalised citizens of Qatar
Association football wingers
Al Sadd SC players
Al-Arabi SC (Qatar) players
Qatar Stars League players